Hōsei Takata (髙田 萌生, born July 4, 1998) is a Japanese professional baseball pitcher for the Tohoku Rakuten Golden Eagles in Japan's Nippon Professional Baseball. He previously played with the Yomiuri Giants from 2018 to 2019.

External links

NPB stats

1998 births
Living people
Nippon Professional Baseball pitchers
Yomiuri Giants players
Baseball people from Okayama Prefecture
Indios de Mayagüez players
Tohoku Rakuten Golden Eagles players
Japanese expatriate baseball players in Puerto Rico